Dry Creek is a stream in the U.S. states of Alabama and Tennessee.  It is a tributary to the Tennessee River.

Dry Creek was descriptively named.

References

Rivers of Lauderdale County, Alabama
Rivers of Alabama
Rivers of Hardin County, Tennessee
Rivers of Tennessee